Toombeola, (Irish language - Tuaim Beola), is a village in Connemara, County Galway, Ireland. The village is also known locally as The Fishery. The Owenmore River of the nearby fishery at Ballynahinch, County Galway, enters the sea at Toombeola Bridge. The bridge was completed in the early 1830s as part of road improvements in the Connemara area carried out by the Scottish engineer, Alexander Nimmo.

History 
The literal translation of Toombeola is Tomb of Beola. Beola was an ancient chieftain in the Connemara area. It is also the site of a Dominican Abbey, St Patricks, founded in 1427. The Abbey is now in ruins, although the surrounding cemetery remains in use. The abbey was built with the help of a local Chieftain of the O'Flaherty Clan (or gaelic, Ó Flaithbertaigh), who ruled over the Connemara region until the time of King James II of England. The abbey was deserted by the Dominican Brothers between 1558 and 1559, during the early reign of Queen Elizabeth I, following an attack by soldiers of the Crown. According to local lore, one of the last known Brothers to serve at the abbey, Fr. John Tully, swam across the Owenmore River in an effort to escape the attack, but was shot and killed by soldiers on the other side. Locals buried him at the site of his death, although traces of the grave no longer remain. Stones from the abbey were used by local chieftain, Tadgh na Buile O'Flaherty, to build his castle, located at a small island on Ballynahinch Lake. A dispute over the ownership of the castle, led to a feud between Tadgh na Buile O'Flaherty and his cousin Teige Ó Flaithbheartaigh.

References 
http://places.galwaylibrary.ie/asp/fullresult.asp?id=49628
http://www.geograph.ie/photo/836961

Towns and villages in County Galway